Whiteleysburg is an unincorporated community in Kent County, Delaware, United States. Whiteleysburg is located at the intersection of Delaware Route 12 and Whiteleysburg Road, just east of the Maryland border.

See also

Whiteleysburg, Maryland

References

Unincorporated communities in Kent County, Delaware
Unincorporated communities in Delaware